This is a bibliography of literature treating the topic of criticism of Islam, sorted by source publication and the author's last name.

General
 Bostom, Andrew. (2008) The Legacy of Jihad, Prometheus Books. 
 Bat Ye'or (2001) Islam and Dhimmitude: Where Civilizations Collide, Madison, N.J.: Fairleigh Dickinson University Press. 
 Bostom, Andrew. The Legacy of Islamic Antisemitism
 Bostom, Andrew. Sharia versus Freedom
 Shaikh, Anwar. Islam: The Arab National Movement (1995). Cardiff: Principality Publishers.
 Shaikh, Anwar. (1998). Anwar Shaikh's Islam, the Arab imperialism. Cardiff: Principality Publishers. 
 Benjamin, Daniel (2002). "The Age of Sacred Terror" Random House. 
 Karsh, Efraim (2006). Islamic Imperialism: A History, Yale University Press. 
 Ghosh, A. (1983). The Koran and the kafir: Islam and the infidel : all that an infidel needs to know about the Koran but is embarrassed to ask.
 Harris, Sam. (2004) The End of Faith: Religion, Terror, and the Future of Reason, W.W.Norton. 
 Harris Sam. Islam and the Future of Tolerance (2015)
 Hitchens, Christopher (2007). God Is Not Great: How Religion Poisons Everything, New York: Twelve Books, . (Chapter nine assesses the religion of Islam)
 Majumdar, Suhas. Jihad The Islamic doctrine Of permanent war (2001)
 Manji, Irshad. (2004), The Trouble with Islam, Vintage Canada, 
 Moorthy Muthuswamy. Defeating Political Islam: The New Cold War (2009)
 Narain, Harsh. Jizyah and the Spread of Islam (1990)
 Pipes, Daniel (1983). In the Path of God: Islam and Political Power, Transaction Publishers. 
 Pipes, Daniel. The Rushdie Affair: The Novel, the Ayatollah, and the West (1990), Transaction Publishers, paperback (2003) 
 Shourie, Arun. The World of Fatwas or the Sharia in Action: (2012)
 Spencer, Robert. The Truth About Muhammad: Founder of the World's Most Intolerant Religion, Regnery Press, 2006 (NYT bestseller list – 2006-10-29) 
 Spencer, Robert.  The Politically Incorrect Guide to Islam (And the Crusades), Regnery Press, 2005. (NYT bestseller list – 2005-10-16) 
 Spencer, Robert. 
 Spencer, Robert. 
 Spencer, Robert. 
 Spencer, Robert. The Myth of Islamic Tolerance: How Islamic Law Treats Non-Muslims (editor), Prometheus Books, 2005. 
 Spencer, Robert.  Onward Muslim Soldiers: How Jihad Still Threatens America and the West, Regnery Publishing, 2003. 
 Spencer, Robert.  
 Spencer, Robert.  
 Swarup, Ram: Understanding Islam through Hadis (1983)
 Trifkovic, Serge. The Sword of the Prophet: The politically incorrect guide to Islam: History, Theology, Impact on the World, Boston, Regina Orthodox Press (2002); 
 Ibn Warraq. The Islam in Islamic Terrorism: The Importance of Beliefs, Ideas, and Ideology.

Criticism of Islamic texts 
 Spencer, Robert.  
 Ibn Warraq. The Origins of The Koran: Classic Essays on Islam's Holy Book, edited by Ibn Warraq, Prometheus Books, 1998, hardcover, 420 pages, 
 Ibn Warraq. The Quest for the Historical Muhammad, edited and translated by Ibn Warraq, Prometheus Books, 2000, hardcover, 554 pages, 
 Ibn Warraq. What the Koran Really Says: Language, Text, and Commentary, edited and translated by Ibn Warraq, Prometheus Books, 2002, 600 pages, 
 Ibn Warraq. Which Koran?: Variants, Manuscripts, and the Influence of Pre-Islamic Poetry , Prometheus Books, 2008, 631 pages, 
 Ibn Warraq.  Koranic Allusions: The Biblical, Qumranian, and pre-Islamic background to the Koran,  Prometheus Books, 2013, 463 pages,  
 Ibn Warraq. Christmas in the Koran: Luxenberg, Syriac, and the Near Eastern and Judeo-Christian Background of Islam, edited by Ibn Warraq, Prometheus Books, 2014, hardcover, 805 pages,

Literature and plays
 Teaching of Jacob (634-640)
 Jihad! The Musical
 Dayananda, S., & Bharadwaja, C. (1915). Light of truth : Or an English translation of the Satyarth Prakash, the well-known work. Allahabad: Arya Pratinidhi Sabha. (Chapter 14)
 Nasrin, Taslima: Lajja (1997). Shame: A Novel. Kankabati Datta (translation of Lajja). Amherst: Prometheus Books. .
 Padmanābha, ., & Bhatnagar, V. S. (1991). Kānhaḍade prabandha: India's greatest patriotic saga of medieval times : Padmanābha's epic account of Kānhaḍade.
 Rushdie, Salman. The Satanic Verses.
 Voltaire, (1736) Mahomet

Autobiographical and travelogues
Maajid Nawaz: Radical: My Journey out of Islamist Extremism
 Ibn Warraq. Leaving Islam: Apostates Speak Out, edited by Ibn Warraq, Prometheus Books, 2003, hardcover, 320 pages, 
 ibn Warraq (1995). "Why I Am Not a Muslim", Prometheus Books. 
 Darwish, Nonie (2006) Now They Call Me Infidel, Sentinel. 
 V. S. Naipaul (1981). Among the Believers: An Islamic Journey, Knoph. 
 V. S. Naipaul (1998). Beyond Belief: Islamic Excursions among the Converted Peoples.

Women and Islam
 Bellil, Samira., To Hell and Back: The Life of Samira Bellil. Trans. Bison Books 2008
 Sushmita Banerjee (1999). Kabul[i]wala's Bengalee wife. Calcutta: Bhasa o Sahitya.
 Skaine, R. (2002). The women of Afghanistan under the Taliban. Jefferson, N.C: McFarland. 
 Laṭīfa, ., & Hachemi, C. (2007). My forbidden face: Growing up under the Taliban; a young woman's story. London: Virago. 
 Shaikh, Anwar (1999). Islam: Sex and violence. Cardiff: Principality Publishers.
 Durrani, T., Hoffer, W., & Hoffer, M. (1998). My feudal lord:A Devastating Indictment of Women's Role in Muslim Society. London: Corgi Books.
 Ali, Ayaan Hirsi (2002 in Dutch) De zoontjesfabriek. Over vrouwen, islam en integratie Uitgeverij Augustus 
 Ali, Ayaan Hirsi (2015) Heretic: Why Islam Needs a Reformation Now, Harper Publications. 
 Ali, Ayaan Hirsi (2006 in English) The Caged Virgin: An Emancipation Proclamation for Women and Islam 
 Ali, Ayaan Hirsi (2007 in English) Infidel: My Life 
 Ali, Ayaan Hirsi (2010) Nomad: From Islam to America: A Personal Journey Through the Clash of Civilizations  
 Nasrin, Taslima (2002). My Bengali Girlhood. Gopa Majumdar (trans.). South Royalton: Steerforth Press. . Trans. of Meyebela
 Swarup, Ram: Woman in Islam (1994) 
 Sultan, Wafa, (2009) A God Who Hates: The Courageous Woman Who Inflamed the Muslim World Speaks Out Against the Evils of Islam, St. Martin's Press, 
 Koofi, F., & Ghouri, N. (2012). The favored daughter: One woman's fight to lead Afghanistan into the future. Basingstoke: Palgrave Macmillan. 
 Yousafzai, M., Lamb, C., & Panjabi, A. (2013). I Am Malala: The Story of the Girl Who Stood Up for Education and was Shot by the Taliban. 
 Wahab, S. (2013). In my father's country: An afghan woman defies her fate. New York: Crown. 
 Ahmedi, F., Ansary, M. T., & Ahmedi, F. (2008). The other side of the sky: A memoir. New York: Simon Spotlight Entertainment.

By continent

Africa 
 Gregory Alonso Pirio, The African Jihad.  The Red Sea Press, Inc. (August 16, 2007)

Asia

South Asia 
 Ambedkar, B. R. (2005). Pakistan or the partition of India. 
 Aziz, K. K. (2010). The murder of history: A critique of history textbooks used in Pakistan. Lahore: Sang-e-Meel Publ. 
 Benkin, Richard: A Quiet Case of Ethnic Cleansing: The Murder of Bangladesh's Hindus (2008)
 Ghosh Dastidar, Sachi (2008). Empire's Last Casualty: Indian Subcontinent's vanishing Hindu and other Minorities. Kolkata: Firma KLM.
 Goel, Sita Ram The Story of Islamic Imperialism in India (1994) 
 Goel, Sita Ram The Calcutta Quran Petition by Chandmal Chopra and Sita Ram Goel (1986, enlarged 1987 and again 1999) 
 Gopal, Ram : Indian Resistance to Early Muslim Invaders Up to 1206 AD.
 Elst, Koenraad. Ayodhya and After: Issues Before Hindu Society, 1991. 
 Elst, Koenraad. Negationism in India: Concealing the Record of Islam (1992) 
 Harsh Narain: The Ayodhya Temple Mosque Dispute: Focus on Muslim Sources (1993)
 Narain, Harsh: Myths of Composite Culture and Equality of Religions  (1991)
 Jain, Meenakshi: Parallel Pathways: Essays on Hindu-Muslim Relations, 1707–1857 (Konark Publishers, 2010), .
 Kamra, A.J. The Prolonged Partition and Its Pogroms (2000)
 Lal, K. S. The Legacy of Muslim Rule in India. New Delhi, Aditya Prakashan, 1992.
 Lal, K. S. Muslim Slave System in Medieval India (1994) 
 Lal, K. S. Theory and Practice of Muslim State in India (1999) 
 Koul, M. L. (1994). Kashmir, past and present: Unravelling the mystique. New Delhi: Manav Publications and Sehyog Prakashan. 
 Sandeep, B. (2013). Tipu Sultan: The tyrant of Mysore. Chennai: Rare Publications. 
 Sheshadri, H.V.: The Tragic Story of Partition. (2002)
 Sarkar, Jadunath: History of Aurangzeb (1972)
 Swarup, Ram: Hindu View of Christianity and Islam (1993)
 Sahagala, N. (1994). Converted Kashmir: Memorial of mistakes. Delhi: Utpal Publications. 
 Shourie, Arun & Goel, S. R., (1991). Hindu Temples: What Happened to Them. New Delhi: Voice of India. (1990 vol.1 ; 1991 vol.2 , enlarged 1993)
 Shourie, Arun: Eminent Historians: Their Technology, Their Line, Their Fraud (1998)
 Shourie, Arun (2006). Indian controversies: Essays on religion in politics. New Delhi: Rupa & Co.

West Asia 
 Gold, Dore (2003). Hatred's Kingdom: How Saudi Arabia Supports the New Global Terrorism Regnery. 
 Lewis, Bernard (2001). What Went Wrong?: The Clash Between Islam and Modernity in the Middle East, Oxford University Press. 
 Schwartz, Stephen (2002). The Two Faces of Islam: The House of Sa'ud from Tradition to Terror, Doubleday.

Europe 
 Bawer, Bruce, Surrender: Appeasing Islam, Sacrificing Freedom, Doubleday, 2009-05-19, 
 Bawer, Bruce, The New Quislings: How the International Left Used the Oslo Massacre to Silence Debate About Islam, Broadside Books, 2012-01-31, 
 Bawer, Bruce, While Europe Slept: How Radical Islam is Destroying the West from Within, New York, Doubleday, 2006 
 Blankley, Tony, The West's Last Chance: Will We Win the Clash of Civilizations?, Washington, D.C., Regnery Publishing, Inc., 2005-02-25, 
 Fallaci, Oriana, The Force of Reason, New York, Rizzoli International, 2006 
 Israeli, Raphael, The Islamic Challenge in Europe, Transaction Publishers, 2008-06-16, 
 Israeli, Raphael, The Spread of Islamikaze Terrorism in Europe: The Third Islamic Invasion, Vallentine Mitchell Publishers, 2008-08-11, 
 Lindhout, A., & Corbett, S. (2014). A house in the sky: A memoir.
 Camus, Renaud, Le Grand Remplacement, David Reinharc, 2011-11-02, 
 Dalrymple, Theodore (2011). The New Vichy Syndrome. Why European Intellectuals Surrender to Barbarism, New York: Encounter books. 
 Houellebecq, Michel, Soumission, 2015
 Jensen, Peder Are Nøstvold, Defeating Eurabia, 2008,  
 Laqueur, Walter, The Last Days of Europe:  Epitaph for an Old Continent, Thomas Dunne Books, 2007-05-15, 
 Laqueur, Walter, After the Fall: The End of the European Dream and the Decline of a Continent, Thomas Dunne Books, 2012-02-13, 
Phillips, Melanie (2006). Londonistan: How Britain is creating a terror state within. London: Encounter books. , 
 Pryce-Jones, David (2008). Betrayal: France, the Arabs, and the Jews, New York: Encounter books, 2006-10-25, 
 Sanders, Doug, The Myth of the Muslim Tide: Do Immigrants Threaten the West?, Knopf, 2012-08-21, 
 Sam Solomon, E Al Maqdisi, Modern Day Trojan Horse: Al-Hijra, The Islamic Doctrine of Immigration, Accepting Freedom or Imposing Islam?, Advancing Native Missions, 2009, 
 Øyvind Strømmen, Det mørke nettet, Cappelen Damm, 2011-11-09, 
 Thornton, Bruce, Decline and Fall: Europe's Slow Motion Suicide, Encounter Books, 2008
 Wilders, Geert, Marked for Death: Islam's War Against the West and Me, Regnery Publishing, 2012-05-01, 
 Bat Ye'or (2005). Eurabia: The Euro-Arab Axis, Madison, N.J.: Fairleigh Dickinson University Press. 
 Bat Ye'or (2011). Europe, Globalization, and the Coming of the Universal Caliphate, Madison, N.J.: Fairleigh Dickinson University Press.

North America
 Geller, Pamela (2011) Stop the Islamization of America: A Practical Guide for the Resistance, WND Books. 
 Pipes, Daniel (2002). Militant Islam Reaches America, W.W. Norton & Company. 
 
 Spencer, Robert.

Reports
 David Lagerlöf, Jonathan Leman, Alexander Bengtsson (2011).  , Expo Research
 Alexander Meleagrou-Hitchens, Hans Brun, A Neo-Nationalist Network: The English Defence League and Europe's Counter-Jihad Movement, International Centre for the Study of Radicalisation and Political Violence, March 2013

See also 
 Bibliography of books critical of Christianity
 Bibliography of books critical of Judaism
 Bibliography of books critical of Mormonism
 Bibliography of books critical of Scientology
 List of apologetic works
 List of Christian apologetic works
 List of Islamic apologetic works

References

Islam-related controversies
 
Bibliographies of subcultures
Lists of books about religion